Mahander Nagpal (born 18 April 1959) is a leader of Bharatiya Janata Party and a former member of the Delhi Legislative Assembly. He was elected as MCD Councillor in 1997. In 2013 he was elected to Delhi assembly from Wazirpur.

References

1959 births
Living people
Delhi MLAs 2013–2015
Place of birth missing (living people)
Bharatiya Janata Party politicians from Delhi